The Missoula Maulers were a junior ice hockey team from Missoula, Montana. The team played in the Northern Pacific Hockey League, the American West Hockey League, and the Western States Hockey League. out of Missoula's Glacier Ice Rink.

Michael Burks is the club's principal owner and president of operations. In 2016, Burks and the nonprofit Missoula Area Youth Association (MAYHA), the operator of Glacier Ice Rink, had a lease dispute and Burks decided to shut down the team rather than continue to fight the operators for a better contract. The Maulers were quickly replaced at the Glacier Ice Rink by a North American 3 Hockey League expansion team, named the Missoula Jr. Bruins, owned by Jason and Liz DiMatteo.

History
The Maulers were founded as an expansion team for the 2007–08 season in the Northern Pacific Hockey League (NorPac). They played in the NorPac until 2011 when many of the eastern NorPac teams formed the new American West Hockey League (AWHL) including the Maulers. After two seasons, the Maulers announced that were leaving the AWHL for the Amateur Athletic Union-sanctioned Western States Hockey League(WSHL).

The players, ages 16–20, carried amateur status under Tier III/Tier II/Junior A guidelines with hopes to earn a spot on a collegiate or minor professional team.

Former leagues
 2007–2011: Northern Pacific Hockey League
 2011–2013: American West Hockey League
 2013–2016: Western States Hockey League

Season-by-season records

References

External links
Official website

2007 establishments in Montana
American West Hockey League teams
Ice hockey teams in Montana
Ice hockey clubs established in 2007
Sports in Missoula, Montana
2016 disestablishments in Montana
Ice hockey clubs disestablished in 2016